Don't Tell Mama may refer to:

"Don't Tell Mama", a 2010 song by Honor Bright on the album Action! Drama! Suspense!
"Don't Tell Mama", a song from the Broadway musical Cabaret by Kander and Ebb
Don't Tell Mama (venue), a long established Manhattan cabaret restaurant on 46th Street